The Education Law of 1912 (Luxembourgish: Schoulgesetz) was passed on 25 June 1912 by the Chamber of Deputies of Luxembourg. The law concerned primary school education in the country and introduced the following changes:

Abolition of school fees
7 years of obligatory schooling
Reduction of maximum class sizes to 70
Singing, gymnastics, drawing, and a basic knowledge of biology and physics, were introduced as new subjects
Luxembourgish became a mandatory subject

It was believed that, with the (relatively late) industrialisation of the country, the population needed a suitable education to enable them to work in the new sectors of the economy. In the preceding years, more or less all the senior jobs in the steel industry, from foremen to engineers, had been taken by Germans. The basis for a good vocational training, was a solid primary school education. Another background motivation for the law was to introduce a broader education, beyond just literacy and numeracy, with a view to introducing universal suffrage (which was to happen in 1919). 

The second part of the law concerned the status of teachers. It included the following measures:

Right of the teacher (or a representative of the teachers) to be a member of the local commune's school commission
The law requiring teachers to participate in religious education was abolished
Teachers no longer needed a certificate of their religious standing, in order to be employed
The local pastor was no longer responsible for supervising teachers

The vote in the Chamber was preceded by a long political debate between the Left Bloc on the one hand, and the Right Bloc on the other. Especially the second part of the law was heavily criticised by the Church. Adherents of the Left Bloc, on the other hand, did not believe the law went far enough. The Chamber finally approves the law by 34 for, 17 against, with 1 abstention. 

On 10 July 1912 the Director-General (Minister) Pierre Braun presented the law to Grand Duchess Marie-Adelaide for her signature. She signed it on 10 August 1912, although reluctantly, as she saw it as a matter of conscience. As a staunch Catholic, she was initially unwilling to approve a law described by the church authorities as unacceptable and unworkable. 

Her reluctance to give her signature was one of the criticisms leveled at her later in 1919, and which contributed to her abdication.

See also
 Education in Luxembourg

References

Further reading

Calmes, Christian, . "La loi scolaire de 1912." In: Christian Calmes: Au fil de l'Histoire. Luxembourg: Éditions de l'Imprimerie Saint-Paul, 1977. p. 49-165.
Fayot, Ben. "Moralitätszeugnis für den Lehrer: der Linksblock und das Schulgesetz von 1912." In: Lëtzebuerger Allmanach vum Jorhonnert, 1900-1999. Luxembourg: Éditions Guy Binsfeld, 1999. p.106-118.
Hoffmann S. "La loi scolaire de 1912: origines et buts". Tageblatt, 19-20 March 1994. p. 10.
 Kirsch E.; Maas J.; Reding Jean-Claude. La loi Braun de 1812: la libération de l'instituteur. Luxembourg: Éditions FGIL, 1987. 128 p.
 Moes, Régis. "La réforme scolaire de 1912". In: forum Nr. 325, January 2013. p. 35-38.

1912 in Luxembourg
History of Luxembourg (1890–1945)
Law of Luxembourg